PRI may refer to:

Entertainment and media
 Performance Racing Industry, a magazine
 PRI Records, in Los Angeles, US
 Public Radio International, Minneapolis, US

Measurements and codes
 Perceptual Reasoning Index, in the WAIS-IV intelligence test
 Photochemical Reflectance Index
 Pulse repetition interval
 Praslin Island Airport (IATA:PRI), Seychelles
 Puerto Rico (ISO 3166-1 alpha-3: PRI)

Political parties
 Independent Regionalist Party, Chile
 Institutional Revolutionary Party, Mexico
 Italian Republican Party, Italy

Research organizations
 Pacific Research Institute, California, US
 Paleontological Research Institution, Ithaca, New York, US
 Penal Reform International
 Population Research Institute (organization), Virginia, US, anti-contraception and abortion

Technology
 Cromemco PRI printer interface card
 Primary Rate Interface, telecommunication standard

Other uses
 PRI disease resistant apple breeding program
 Principles for Responsible Investment, UN initiative